William Coventre may refer to:

William Coventre I, MP for Devizes October 1383 and 1393
William Coventre II, MP for Melcombe Regis 1397
William Coventre III (died c.1445), MP for Devizes 1414, 1415, 1417, May 1421, 1422, 1423, 1426, 1427 and 1433

See also
William Coventry (disambiguation)